Sherri is an American syndicated daytime talk show hosted by actress and comedienne, Sherri Shepherd. The show premiered on September 12, 2022, and is distributed by Debmar-Mercury, with the Fox Television Stations as its major affiliate base.

Sherri is filmed live at Chelsea Studios in New York. The series serves as a de facto replacement for The Wendy Williams Show, which Shepherd served as an interim host for in much of the last portion of the thirteenth season due to personal and medical issues involving Williams. Much of the production team for Wendy thus carried over to Shepherd's show, along with its existing studio re-configured with a new set design. In January 2023, the series was renewed for its second and third seasons through 2025. Executive producer, Jawn Murray is featured on air as a commentator.

Awards and nominations

References

External links
 
 

2022 American television series debuts
2020s American television talk shows
First-run syndicated television programs in the United States
English-language television shows
Television shows filmed in New York City
Television series by Lionsgate Television
Television series by CBS Studios